Annales Bohemorum may refer to the main work of:

Vincent of Prague (fl. 1140–1170)
Wenceslaus Hajek (d. 1553)